Bhaskar Yadram (born 18 September 1999) is a Guyanese cricketer. He made his List A debut for the West Indies Under-19s in the 2016–17 Regional Super50 on 25 January 2017. He made his first-class debut for Guyana in the 2016–17 Regional Four Day Competition on 21 April 2017.

In November 2017, he was named in the West Indies squad for the 2018 Under-19 Cricket World Cup. He was the leading wicket-taker for the West Indies in the tournament, with 11 wickets.

In October 2019, he was named in the Windward Islands' squad for the 2019–20 Regional Super50 tournament. In June 2021, he was selected to take part in the Minor League Cricket tournament in the United States following the players' draft.

References

External links
 

1999 births
Living people
Guyanese cricketers
Guyana cricketers
Place of birth missing (living people)